Avinash Yadav (born 2 October 1986) is an Indian cricketer. He was the leading wicket-taker for Railways in the 2018–19 Ranji Trophy, with 41 dismissals in eight matches.

References

External links
 

1986 births
Living people
Indian cricketers
Railways cricketers
Uttar Pradesh cricketers
Cricketers from Varanasi
Mumbai Champs cricketers